Bowles House may refer to:

in the United States
(by state)
Bowles Hall, Berkeley, CA, a dormitory house at University of California, Berkeley, that is listed on the NRHP in California
Bowles-Cooley House, Aspen, CO, listed on the NRHP in Colorado
Bowles House (Westminster, Colorado), listed on the NRHP in Colorado
Joseph R. Bowles House, Portland, OR, listed on the NRHP in Oregon
Jesse C. Bowles House, Seattle, WA, listed on the NRHP in Washington